This is a list of historical and living Bosniaks (of Bosnia or the Bosnian diaspora) who are famous or notable sportspeople.

Basketball 

Adnan Hodžić
Adin Vrabac
Asım Pars
Damir Mršić
Damir Mulaomerović
Dino Murić
Džanan Musa
Edin Bavčić
Edo Murić
Elmedin Kikanović
Emir Mutapčić
Emir Preldžič
Emir Sulejmanović
Hasan Rizvić
Hedo Türkoğlu
Jasmin Hukić
Jusuf Nurkić
Kenan Bajramović
Memi Bečirovič
Mirsad Türkcan (Jahović)
Mirza Begić
Mirza Delibašić
Mirza Teletović
Nedžad Sinanović
Nedim Buza
Nedim Đedović
Nihad Đedović
Rasid Mahalbasić
Sabahudin Bilalović
Sabit Hadžić
Sani Bečirovič
Sead Šehović
Suad Šehović
Mersada Bećirspahić
Razija Mujanović
Tima Džebo

Football (soccer)

Abdulah Gegić
Adem Ljajić
Adis Jahović
Admir Smajić
Adnan Gušo
Ahmed Mujdragić
Ajdin Maksumić
Aldin Gurdijeljac
Alen Avdić
Alen Halilović
Alen Orman
Alen Škoro
Almedin Hota
Almir Gegić
Almir Gredić
Almir Memić
Almir Turković
Amer Osmanagić
Anel Ahmedhodžić
Asim Ferhatović
Baggio Husidić
Bajro Župić
Damir Džombić
Darijo Srna
Dennis Hadžikadunić
Dino Djulbic
Dželaludin Muharemović
Džemaludin Mušović
Edhem Šljivo
Edin Džeko
Edin Ferizović
Ediz Bahtiyaroğlu
Eldin Adilović
Eldin Jakupović
Elsad Zverotić
Elvir Baljić
Elvir Bolić
Emir Bihorac
Elvir Čolić
Emir Hadžić
Emir Janjoš
Emir Lotinac
Emir Obuća
Emir Spahić
Enver Alivodić
Enver Hadžiabdić
Enver Marić
Ersin Mehmedović
Ervin Zukanović
Ervin Sehovic
Esad Karišik
Esad Komić
Fahrudin Kuduzović
Fahrudin Mustafić
Faruk Hadžibegić
Faruk Hujdurović
Fuad Muzurović
Hajrudin Saračević
Halil Kanacević
Haris Medunjanin
Haris Seferovic
Haris Smajić
Hasan Salihamidžić
Husref Musemić
Ibrahim Biogradlić
Ibrahim Šehić
Ifet Taljević
Irfan Vušljanin
Izet Hajrović
Jasmin Handanovič
Jasmin Kurtić
Jasmin Trtovac
Jasmin Šćuk
Kenan Kodro
Kenan Ragipović
Mehmed Baždarević
Mehmed Janjoš
Meho Kodro
Miralem Pjanić
Mirsad Baljić
Mirsad Bešlija
Mirsad Fazlagić
Mirsad Türkcan
Mirza Golubica
Mirza Kapetanović
Mirza Varešanović
Muamer Svraka
Muhamed Bešić
Muhamed Konjić
Muhamed Mujić
Munever Rizvić
Mustafa Hasanagić
Mustafa Sejmenović
Nenad Bijedić
Nera Smajić
Nermin Haskić
Nijaz Ferhatović
Ömer Çatkıç
Rahim Beširović
Rašid Avdić
Refik Kozić
Refik Šabanadžović
Safet Sušić
Saffet Sancaklı
Said Husejinović
Samir Bekrić
Samir Handanovič
Samir Muratović
Sanel Kuljić
Saudin Huseinović
Sead Bajramović
Sead Bučan
Sead Hadžibulić
Sead Halilagić
Sead Kolašinac
Sead Muratović
Sead Zilić
Sedin Alić
Sedin Torlak
Sejad Halilović
Sejad Salihović
Selver Hodžić
Semir Hadžibulić
Semir Kerla
Senad Lulić
Sergej Barbarez
Sulejman Smajić
Tarik Hodžić
Vahid Halilhodžić
Vahidin Musemić
Vedad Ibišević
Veldin Muharemović
Zijad Arslanagić
Zlatan Bajramović
Zlatan Ibrahimović
Zlatan Muslimović
Zlatko Junuzović

Handball

Alen Muratović
Enid Tahirović
Ermin Velić
Irfan Smajlagić
Mirsad Terzić
Mirza Džomba
Muhammed Memić
Muhamed Toromanović

Martial arts

Emir Ahmatović, boxer
Irma Balijagić, boxer
Behudin Bašović, kickboxer
Bido Bašović, kickboxer
Nermin Bašović, kickboxer
Mirsad Bektić, mixed martial artist
Džemal Bošnjak, boxer
Mensur Cakić, karateka
Larisa Cerić, judoka
Adnan Ćatić (Felix Sturm), amateur and professional boxer
Admir Ćupina, karateka
Suad Ćupina, karateka
Salko Ćurić, karateka
Zejd Dukmenić, taekwondo
Adem Fetahović, boxer
Almedin Fetahović, boxing coach and amateur boxer
Hamid Guska, boxing coach and amateur boxer
Memnun Hadžić, boxer
Fahrudin Hodžić, wrestler
Marco Huck, boxer
Amer Hrustanović, wrestler
Nedžad Husić, taekwondo
Kenan Husović, boxer
Ermin Junuzović "Erko Jun", mixed martial artist
Arnel Kalušić, karateka
Safet Kapo, kickboxing coach
Omer Kolašinac "Dandi", boxing coach and amateur boxer
Esmir Kukić, boxer
Enad Ličina, boxer
Amel Mekić, judoka
Almir Memić, boxer
Ismet Methadžević, boxing coach and amateur boxer
Denis Muhović, karateka
Zaim Numanović, boxing coach and amateur boxer
Arnela Odžaković, karateka
Mensur Peljto, boxer and kickboxer
Zijad Poljo, kickboxer
Dževad Poturak, kickboxer
Halid Ranica, boxer
Adnan Redžović, boxer and kickboxer
Una Selman, karateka
Mehmed Skomorac, boxer 
Merima Softić, karateka
Mirsada Suljkanović, karateka
Edip Šećović, boxer
Džejlan Toskić, boxer

Volleyball

Adnan Herco
Adis Lagumdžija
Ekrem Lagumdžija
Ifet Mahmutović

Other

Almir Velagić, weightlifter
Amel Tuka, track and field athlete
Ensar Hajder, Olympic swimmer
Fikret Hodžić, bodybuilder
Hamza Alić, track and field athlete
Michi Halilović, German skeleton racer of Bosniak descent
Nedžad Ćatić, Australian professional rugby league footballer
Nedim Nišić, Olympic swimmer
Nedžad Fazlija, sports shooter

Dino Beganovic Racing Driver

Tennis
Amer Delić, tennis player
Damir Džumhur, tennis player
Ivan Ljubičić, tennis player (Croatian father, Bosniak mother)
Mervana Jugić-Salkić, tennis player

See also 
 List of Bosnians
 List of Bosniaks
 Bosnian people category

 
Sportspeople